Erik Jansson (14 May 1907 – 24 July 1993) was a Swedish road racing cyclist who competed in the 1928 Summer Olympics.

In 1928 he won the bronze medal as part of the Swedish road cycling team, after finishing 14th in the individual road race.

References

External links

1907 births
1993 deaths
Swedish male cyclists
Olympic cyclists of Sweden
Cyclists at the 1928 Summer Olympics
Olympic bronze medalists for Sweden
Olympic medalists in cycling
People from Falun Municipality
Medalists at the 1928 Summer Olympics
Sportspeople from Dalarna County
20th-century Swedish people